Rodrigue Bourdages (22 October 1923 – 12 October 1997) was a Canadian politician and contractor. He was elected to the House of Commons of Canada as a Member of the Progressive Conservative Party in 1958 to represent the riding of Laval. He was defeated in the 1957 election as an independent candidate and as a PC candidate in 1962.

External links
 

1923 births
1997 deaths
Independent candidates in the 1957 Canadian federal election
Members of the House of Commons of Canada from Quebec
Candidates in the 1962 Canadian federal election
Progressive Conservative Party of Canada MPs
Place of death missing